Riyad Farid Hijab (born 1966) is a Syrian politician. He was Prime Minister of Syria from June to August 2012, serving under President Bashar al-Assad. From 2011 to 2012, he was Minister of Agriculture.

On 6 August 2012, the Syrian government released a statement saying that Hijab had been dismissed. Shortly thereafter a man describing himself as Hijab's spokesman and several news organizations stated he had resigned and defected to the rebel side in the Syrian civil war. Information minister Omran al-Zoub's later remarks about "the flight of some personalities" were interpreted by The Guardian as referring to Hijab. Hijab is the highest-ranking defector from the Syrian government.

Early life and education
Hijab was born into a Sunni Muslim family of the city of Deir ez-Zor in Deir ez-Zor Governorate in 1966. He holds a doctorate (PhD) in agricultural engineering.

Career
Hijab was the president of the Azzour branch of the National Union of Syrian Students from 1989 to 1998, and  he was a member of the leadership of the Ba'ath Party Branch from 1998 to 2004. In 2004, Hijab became secretary of the Deir ez-Zor branch of the Ba'ath Party, a post which he retained until 2008.

Hijab was appointed governor of Quneitra Governorate in 2008, and on 22 February 2011, he was appointed governor of Latakia Governorate. His appointment occurred at the initial phase of the Syrian civil war. He was also named as the head of the security committee in the province to monitor and suppress the opposition activities. He was appointed minister of agriculture and agrarian reform on 14 April 2011, replacing Adel Safar who had been named Prime Minister of Syria.

On 6 June 2012, after a parliamentary election, which was boycotted by the rebels, Hijab was named by President Bashar al-Assad as Prime Minister of Syria. BBC News described him as "a staunch Assad loyalist and a key member of the ruling Ba'ath Party." The appointment reportedly surprised experts, as al-Assad had been expected to give his government more credibility by naming a non-Ba'athist. Shortly after his appointment as prime minister, the US Treasury sanctioned him.

Defection
According to Hijab's former spokesman Mohammad Otari, Hijab resigned, and he and his family defected to Jordan on 6 August 2012. Syrian state TV reported that Hijab had been "sacked" and that Deputy PM Omar Ibrahim Ghalawanji would become the head of a new caretaker government. Hijab released a statement through Otari criticizing the current Syrian government, calling it a "terrorist regime". The statement declared "I am from today a soldier in this blessed revolution". According to Otari, Hijab had been planning his defection for months with the help of the Free Syrian Army. Hijab was reportedly heading for Qatar, an active supporter of the Syrian rebels. Speaking in Amman, Jordan, on 14 August 2012, Hijab alleged that Assad's current government was collapsing "morally, financially and militarily", allegedly only controlling a mere 30% of the entire country still. He called on the Syrian Arab Army and its officers to join the rebellion against president Assad and the Ba'ath party government and for the opposition forces to unite. On 17 August, Hijab held meetings in Doha, Qatar, to discuss Assad's toppling and to attempt unification of Syrian opposition forces.

According to his spokesman Otari on 6 August, Hijab also encouraged other officials to defect, and opposition sources claimed that three other ministers as well as three army generals defected on the same day. However, one of the ministers named by the opposition, Treasurer of Syria Mohamad Gillati appeared on Syrian television later in the day to deny the rumors of his defection to the rebellion.

Though Hijab was not considered a member of Assad's inner circle, BBC News described his departure as the "highest-profile defection since the uprising began in March 2011" and "a stunning blow to President Assad". Guardian writer Ian Black called it "a propaganda coup for the opposition" but not a "fatal blow". The United States government stated that the "defection" showed Assad's government was "crumbling from within". The Barack Obama administration again called for al-Assad's resignation.

Hijab's duties were fulfilled ad-interim by Syrian minister Omar Ibrahim Ghalawanji, who on 9 August 2012 transferred his duties to newly appointed Prime Minister of Syria Dr. Wael Nader al-Halqi, formerly Syrian Minister of Public Health, a Jasim-born Sunni Ba'ath Party official and professor of medical science. President al-Assad rated Hijab's defection as rather positive by stating that it was "self-cleansing of the government firstly, and the country generally". According to Der Spiegel, Hijab and other prominent Syrian defectors were bribed by the French secret services inside the country as well as by Qatar.

Moussa al-Omar conveyed his concerns over the medical treatment and health of Hijab in a tweet.

Role in Syrian opposition
Hijab was selected in Riyadh in December 2015 by Syrian opposition as a head of the Supreme Negotiations Committee (also called Higher Negotiation Committee) which selected the negotiation delegation for the Geneva III negotiation process. In 2017 he resigned as head of the group following Saudi pressure.

Political positions
Hijab has said that he is against federalism in Syria.

Personal life
Hijab is married and has four children and is a Sunni Muslim.

References

External links
twitter.com

1966 births
Living people
Agriculture ministers of Syria
Arab Socialist Ba'ath Party – Syria Region politicians
Prime Ministers of Syria
Syrian Sunni Muslims
Syrian defectors
People of the Syrian civil war
People from Deir ez-Zor